End-of-Transmission-Block (ETB) is a communications control character used to indicate the end of a block of data for communications purposes. ETB is used for segmenting data into blocks when the block structure is not necessarily related to the processing function.

In EBCDIC, ETB is code point 0x26.

References
Nichols A., Nichols et al.: Data Communications for Microcomputers (1982) 

ASCII
Control characters